Real Sapphire Football Club is a Nigerian professional football club based in Lagos, Nigeria owned by UK-based Nigerian businessman and football proprietor, Frank Peters.

Notable players 

 Chinonso Offor
 Olabanjo Alexander Ogunji
 Victor Boniface
 Tosin Aiyegun
 Adeleke Akinyemi 
 Kazeem Aderounmu
 David Idowu Akintola
 Emeka Basil
 Ibrahim Olaosebikan
 Chibuike Darlington Nwosu
 Aaron Pamilerin
 Bolaji Ajayi
 Ademo Peter,Oluwaseun
 Adetunji Adeshina Rasaq
 Bamigboye Toheeb, Dare
 Jude Sunday

Management team

{|class="wikitable"
|-
!Position
!Staff
|-
|Sporting Director|| Godwhinn Augustine
|-
|Manager||Andrew George Uwe
|-
|Head coach|| Onolapo Abidemi (Coach Bathez) 
|-
|Assistant coach|| Sunday Adekunbi 
|-
|Second Assistant|| Emmanuel Akala
|-
|Team Manager|| Nwosu Ndubuisi Kingsley 
|-
|Secretary||Joseph Ufot 
|-
|Scout||Cyril Onyebuchi
|-

References

Football clubs in Nigeria
Lagos State
Association football clubs established in 2015
Sports clubs in Nigeria